Off-TV Play is a feature of Nintendo's eighth-generation video game console, the Wii U. Like all video game consoles, the Wii U uses a console and a controller to manipulate an image on a television screen. The Wii U's unique feature is that its controller, the Wii U GamePad, has its own built-in screen for displaying images. It can display an entirely different image, or duplicate the television screen into the Wii U GamePad. Off-TV Play is the term used for when an entire game is played strictly on the controller, without the use of a television.

Background
The Wii U console was officially unveiled at E3 2011 in June 2011, where it was first detailed that the console's controller would feature a tablet-like touchscreen. Nintendo announced that a major focus of the console would be the ability to display the image seen on the television on the touchscreen, to continue playing the game if the television was needed for other uses, or the player needed to move away from the television. Official terms were given at E3 2012; the controller was named the Wii U GamePad and the concept of playing games strictly on its screen being labeled Off-TV Play.

For supported games, a television isn't required to be connected to the Wii U; the Wii U can operate in Off-TV Play mode as long as the console is connected to a power source. However, as the processing is done on the console, and transmitted to the GamePad, the user must still keep within the transmitting range for it to work. Not all games support Off-TV Play, as some games conceptually rely on the asymmetric interplay between the television screen and the Wii U GamePad screen, such as Nintendo Land and ZombiU. However, all Wii U Virtual Console titles purchased from the Nintendo eShop include the option to use Off-TV Play. Original Wii games and Wii Virtual Console games were not initially compatible either, although this was changed in the Wii U's September 30, 2013 system update, which allows it, but only through the use of original Wii peripherals as input methods, meaning that the image would appear on Wii U GamePad screen, but its buttons would not work, requiring the use of Wii Remotes and Wii accessories for button and joystick input. This was partially revised again in January 2015; when Nintendo began releasing Wii games digitally on the Wii U eShop. Because games re-released in this fashion were reworked to run straight from the Wii U operating screen, and not Wii Mode, the game allowed for Off-TV Play on Wii games with GamePad controls, provided the game allowed for Classic Controller usage in its Wii release.

List of Off-TV Play compatible software

Games

Off-TV Play must be initially activated via a menu on the TV screen.

Off-TV Play cannot be activated or disabled mid-game

An update is required to use Off-TV Play.

When using the feature in multiplayer mode, only platforms can be placed using the Wii U GamePad's touchscreen and a Wii Remote and/or Wii U Pro Controller is required.

Off-TV Play is activated by swiping down on touchscreen.

Some activities require both the GamePad and TV screen and are not compatible with Off-TV Play.

Applications

Reception
The concept has received mostly positive reviews. The CNET praised the feature as being "nothing short of fantastic [...] because it prevents the monopolization of a TV while gaming – something anyone who doesn't live alone can appreciate. For those households where the main TV is in constant demand, off-TV sounds like a godsend." However, a major concern cited is that it wasn't a required feature, meaning the developers can opt out of making it possible in their respective games, so in theory, it could become obsolete. Kotaku praised it as well, stating that it is a good feature for those who like to multi-task, since it frees up the television for other uses. TechSpot described it as "a luxury few people asked for but that turns out to be wonderful to have". Destructoid praised it for being exactly the same as playing on the television, only "with some limited portability for no extra charge. Hard to find fault in that." GamesRadar praised the feature for being perfect for the avid television watcher, but criticized the fact that there wasn't a standardized way to activate it, such as its own button. IGN stated in their review for the Wii U, that in regards to single player experiences, they preferred it when the entire game could be transferred to the GamePad over using it in conjunction with a television.

Some critics have argued that the image has superior quality while using Off-TV Play, while others have cited concerns over the small size of the screen making it difficult to see all the details of the image. Eurogamer's "Digital Foundry" testing showed that the Wii U's Off-TV Play feature outperformed Sony's similar Remote Play feature on its PlayStation 4 and PlayStation Vita systems in image quality, latency, and frame-rate. Pocket Gamer agreed, stating that Off-TV Play-offered far less lag than Remote Play.

While critics generally praised the Wii U update enabling Off-TV Play support to original Wii software played in Wii Mode, they generally lamented the update's shortcoming of requiring Wii controllers and peripherals to play rather than the Wii U GamePad itself. This was partially rectified by Nintendo in January 2015, when they announced that Wii games digitally re-released for the Wii U eShop would allow for GamePad controls, because they play directly through the Wii U, and not "Wii Mode" when using the disc version of the games.

See also
Remote Play
Wii U GamePad 
Xbox SmartGlass
List of Wii U software

References

Wii U